The Next Me is the debut album released by the American pop artist, Jasmine.  When the album was released, Jasmine was only 14.  The Next Me is Jasmine's first and only Christian market release.

Media recognition
"Make a Movie" and "Nothing Left to Say" were featured on Radio Disney when Jasmine won the 2009 N.B.T. (Next Big Thing) competition.

Sing-along tracks
Despite the full-length album containing 10 tracks, only 5 of the songs on the album are original.  As consistent with other artists under the iShine label, the last 5 tracks of the album are sing-along versions of the previous 5 songs.

Track listing

Music videos
"Make a Movie"

References

2009 debut albums
Jasmine (American singer) albums